Sheridan Boulevard may refer to:
 Colorado State Highway 95, a road near Denver.
 New York State Route 895, a road in the Bronx.